The Middle East Forum (MEF) is an American conservative think tank founded in 1990 by Daniel Pipes, who serves as its president. MEF became an independent non-profit organization in 1994. It publishes a journal, the Middle East Quarterly.

According to the organization's website, they promote "American interests and works to protect Western civilization from the threat of Islamism", advocate strong ties with Israel and other democracies as they emerge, work for human rights throughout the region; seek a stable supply and a low price of oil; and promote the peaceful settlement of regional and international disputes.

The Middle East Forum, a 501(c)3 tax-exempt nonprofit organization, has established the Legal Project to protect researchers and analysts who work on the topics of Islam and related topics from lawsuits designed to silence their exercise of free speech and to discuss key issues of public concern.
The Legal Project aided Dutch politician Geert Wilders' legal defense when he faced a criminal indictment for his views in 2009.

Publications and projects

Middle East Quarterly

Middle East Quarterly (MEQ) is a peer-reviewed quarterly academic journal published by the Middle East Forum. It covers subjects relating to the Middle East and Islam, and analyzes the region "explicitly from the viewpoint of American interests". It was founded in 1994 by Daniel Pipes and the current editor-in-chief is Efraim Karsh, Research Professor and former Director of Middle East and Mediterranean Studies at King's College London. The journal was not originally peer-reviewed but introduced peer review in 2009 both to improve the quality of articles and "to give junior faculty an opportunity, while building their careers, to express their views freely."

Reception
In 2002 Juan Cole, a professor at the University of Michigan and a Campus Watch target, accused the journal of making "scurrilous attacks on people". In 2014, Christopher A. Bail of Duke University described it as a "pseudo-academic" journal with editorial board members who share an ideological outlook, adding that while it appears to present legitimate academic research, it is regularly criticized "as a channel for anti-Muslim polemics".

Abstracting and indexing
The journal is abstracted and indexed in:
EBSCO databases
Index Islamicus
International Bibliography of the Social Sciences
Modern Language Association Database
ProQuest databases
Scopus

Campus Watch
In 2002, the Middle East Forum initiated the Campus Watch program and identified what it finds to be the five major problems in the teaching of Middle Eastern studies at American universities: "analytical failures, the mixing of politics with scholarship, intolerance of alternative views, apologetics, and the abuse of power over students." Winfield Myers is the director of Campus Watch.

Initially, Campus Watch published a list of problematic instructors, which led some professors to accuse Campus Watch of "McCarthyesque" intimidation; in protest, more than 100 other academics asked to be listed too. Subsequently, Campus Watch removed the list from its website, but replaced it with a list titled Professors to Avoid.

Islamist Watch
On April 21, 2006, the Middle East Forum launched Islamist Watch, a project that it states "combat[s] the ideas and institutions of nonviolent, radical Islam in the United States and other Western countries. It exposes the far-reaching goals of Islamists, works to reduce their power, and seeks to strengthen moderate Muslims."

According to the organization's website, Islamist Watch seeks to educate the government, media, religious institutions, the academy, and the business world about lawful Islamism. It focuses on the political, educational, cultural, and legal activities of Islamists in the United States and, to a lesser degree, in other historically non-Muslim countries, especially Western Europe, Canada, and Australia. Islamist Watch does not focus on counter terrorism and only indirectly concerns Islamism in Muslim-majority countries such as Egypt, Saudi Arabia, and Pakistan, and its three main "activities" include "research, advocacy, and activism."

In 2012, Marc Fink became the director of Islamist Watch.

The Legal Project 

The Middle East Forum established the Legal Project in June 2007 to protect researchers, analysts, and activists who work on radical Islam and related topics from predatory lawsuits designed to silence their exercise of free speech.

According to the Legal Project's website, it acts in four ways to counteract Islamist threats to free speech, "Fundraising for an Escrow account to supplement the court costs and litigation fees for victims of Islamist lawfare (all funds raised go directly to lawfare victims); Arranging for pro bono and reduced rate counsel for victims of Islamist lawfare; Maintaining an international network of attorneys dedicated to working pro bono in the defense of free speech; and, Raising awareness about the issue. Efforts include briefings by legal experts on how to avoid libelous statements, and consultations with libel lawyers before publishing on certain topics."

Middle East Intelligence Bulletin 
The Middle East Intelligence Bulletin was jointly published by the United States Committee for a Free Lebanon and the Middle East Forum. It was, from 1999-2004, a free monthly publication that provided analysis of political and strategic developments in Lebanon, Syria, and the Middle East.

The staff included: Gary C. Gambill as editor and Daniel Pipes and Ziad K. Abdelnour as publishers. The editorial board included Thomas Patrick Carroll, Michael Rubin and Youssef Haddad. Mahan Abedin served as London correspondent.

Israel Victory Project
The Israel Victory Project, launched in 2017, is an initiative aimed at securing an end to the Israeli-Palestinian conflict by putting pressure on Palestinians to end anti-Israel terrorism and acknowledge Israel's legitimacy as a Jewish state, rather than through bilateral negotiations. Daniel Pipes has stated that "Peace is not made with enemies; peace is made with former enemies."

Funding

According to a report by the Center for American Progress published in 2011, the two main contributors to the Middle East Forum were Donors Capital Fund and the William Rosenwald Family Fund.

Georgetown University's Bridge Initiative reported in 2018 that the MEF had received millions of dollars from Donors Capital Fund ($6,768,000), the William Rosenwald Family Fund, the Middle Road Foundation, and the Abstraction Fund.

Support for Tommy Robinson
In 2018, the MEF stated that it had been "heavily involved" in the release from prison of British anti-Islam activist and far-right political operative Tommy Robinson, who is best known as a co-founder, former spokesman and former leader of the English Defence League (EDL) organisation, and for his service as a political adviser to the leader of the UK Independence Party (UKIP), Gerard Batten. They revealed that "the full resources of the Middle East Forum were activated to free Mr. Robinson", which included:
conferring with Robinson's legal team and providing necessary funds; funding, organizing and staffing the "Free Tommy" London rallies on June 9 and July 14, which was, they claim, reported by The Times, The Guardian, and The Independent; funding travel of the US congressman, Rep. Paul Gosar, Republican from Arizona, to London to address the rallies; and lobbied Sam Brownback, the State Department's ambassador-at-large for International Religious Freedom, to raise the issue with the UK's ambassador, which he did. The MEF has itself been considered a part of the counter-jihad movement.

See also

List of think tanks in the United States

References

Further reading
Rubin, Barry, and Judith Colp. Hating America: A History. New York: Oxford University Press, 2004. .

External links 

Middle East Quarterly
Daniel Pipes, the Middle East Forum, founded in 1990

Middle East Forum
Foreign policy and strategy think tanks in the United States
Political and economic think tanks in the United States
Islam and politics
Counter-jihad
Critics of Islamism
Foreign policy political advocacy groups in the United States
Islamophobic publications
501(c)(3) organizations
1990 establishments in Pennsylvania
Anti-Arabism in North America
Arab studies
Conservative organizations in the United States
Political magazines published in the United States
Publications established in 1994
Quarterly journals
Middle Eastern studies journals
Open access journals